Ablabys macracanthus, also known as the spiny waspfish or as the spiny leaf-fish in Indonesia, is a species of marine ray-finned fish, a waspfish belonging to the subfamily Tetraroginae of the family Scorpaenidae, the scorpionfishes and their relatives. This species is found in the Western Pacific and Indian Oceans.

Taxonomy 
Ablabys macracanthus was first formally described in 1852 as Apistus macracanthus by the Dutch physician, herpetologist and ichthyologist Pieter Bleeker with the type locality given as Wahai, northern Ceram, Indonesia. The specific name macracanthus means "large thorn" or "large spine", Bleeker did not explain the allusion but it is presumed to be referring to the characteristic long dorsal fin spines of the genus Ablabys.

Description
Ablabys macracanthus has 15 or 16 spines and between 8 and 10 soft rays in its dorsal fin while the anal fin has 3 spines and 7 or 8 soft rays.

Distribution and habitat 
Ablabys macracanthus is found in the eastern Indian Ocean from the Andaman Sea off Myanmar and Thailand into the western Pacific Ocean reaching east as far as the Philippines and south to New Guinea. It lives at tropical latitudes (25 to 8 degrees north latitude).

Biology 
Ablabys macracanthus is harmless to humans. It can grow up to as long as 20 cm and it often sways with the current, mimicking a pile of leaves.

References

External links
 

macracanthus
Fish described in 1852
Taxa named by Pieter Bleeker
Fish of the Pacific Ocean
Fish of the Indian Ocean